Victor of Tunnuna (Latin Victor Tunnunensis) (died  570) was Bishop of the North African town of Tunnuna and a chronicler from Late antiquity. He was also considered a martyr by Isidore of Seville.

What little information we have on his life is derived from entries in his own chronicle. Victor was a staunch supporter of the Three Chapters which had been condemned by Justinian's edict of 544, and on this account he was arrested.  His first imprisonment was a monastery in Mandracium near Carthage, followed by exile to the Balearic Islands and finally transferred to Egypt to a monastery in Canopus. In 564 or 565 he and five other African bishops were summoned before Emperor Justin II and Patriarch Eutychius in Constantinople. When they refused to submit to the emperor's edict, they were imprisoned in different monasteries throughout Constantinople. Victor died about 569, most likely still confined at the monastery in Constantinople.

Works
Victor is the fifth author and continuator of the chronicle, the Chronicon, started by Sextus Julius Africanus ( 160 - 240), in the early third century was continued by Eusebius (c. 260/5 - 339/40) Jerome (c. 347 - 420), and Prosper of Aquitaine (c. 390 - 455), spanning from the creation of the world to the end of the year 566, which Victor wrote while in confinement. Only the part extending from 444 to 566 is extant. It is of great historical value, dealing chiefly with the Eutychian heresy, the controversy about the Three Chapters, and provides details concerning the Arians and the invasion of the Vandals. In general, church matters receive more attention than other issues in this chronicle. It was continued to 590 by John of Biclaro, founder of the Abbey of Biclar in Visigothic Hispania on the Iberian Peninsula, comprising modern Spain and Portugal and followed at greater length by Isidore of Seville through 616.

Victor has been credited with being the author of the pseudo-Ambrosian De Poenitentia, although Victor of Cartenna seems to be the real author.

The Chronicon (444-566) is available in an English translation by John R. C. Martyn under the title Arians and Vandals of the 4th-6th Centuries.

References

Further reading 

 

Online English translation of the chronicle by Aymenn Jawad Al-Tamimi.

Chroniclers
6th-century Latin writers
6th-century Byzantine bishops
6th-century historians
Historians of Justinian I
6th-century deaths
Year of birth unknown
6th-century Byzantine writers